Clay is both an English surname and a given name, often short for Clayton.

People with the name

Geographical distribution
As of 2014, 76.1% of all known bearers of the surname Clay were residents of the United States (frequency 1:5,846), 12.5% of England (1:5,460), 2.7% of Australia (1:10,816), 1.4% of Canada (1:31,264) and 1.2% of France (1:69,714).

In England, the frequency of the surname was higher than average (1:5,460) in the following counties:
 1. Nottinghamshire (1:1,287)
 2. Derbyshire (1:2,238)
 3. Lincolnshire (1:2,318)
 4. Staffordshire (1:2,357)
 5. Leicestershire (1:2,705)
 6. Warwickshire (1:2,752)
 7. West Yorkshire (1:2,838)
 8. Herefordshire (1:2,856)
 9. South Yorkshire (1:3,014)
 10. Shropshire (1:3,271)
 11. North Yorkshire (1:4,378)
 12. Cornwall (1:4,867)
 13. Hertfordshire (1:5,093)
 14. Cambridgeshire (1:5,301)

In the United States, the frequency of the surname was higher than average (1:5,846) in the following states:
 1. West Virginia (1:1,501)
 2. Mississippi (1:1,690)
 3. Georgia (1:2,391)
 4. Arkansas (1:2,794)
 5. Alabama (1:2,876)
 6. Missouri (1:3,086)
 7. Kentucky (1:3,223)
 8. Louisiana (1:3,418)
 9. Oklahoma (1:3,507)
 10. Tennessee (1:3,769)
 11. Ohio (1:4,169)
 12. Virginia (1:4,296)
 13. Texas (1:4,473)
 14. North Carolina (1:4,705)
 15. Illinois (1:5,138)
 16. Michigan (1:5,431)
 17. Maryland (1:5,696)
 18. Indiana (1:5,723)

Surname
Adam Clay (disambiguation), several people
Alfred Borron Clay (1831–1868), British artist
Allyson Clay, Canadian artist
Bryan Clay (born 1980), American gold medalist in the decathlon at the 2008 Summer Olympics in Beijing
Muhammad Ali (born Cassius Clay, 1942–2016), American boxer 
Cassius Marcellus Clay (politician) (1810–1903), American politician, abolitionist
Cassius Marcellus Clay Sr. (1912–1990), American painter and musician and father of Cassius Clay (Muhammad Ali)
Charles Clay (disambiguation), several people
Craig Clay (born 1992), English footballer
Edward Clay (born 1945), British diplomat
Edward Sneyd Clay (c. 1768 – 1846), British naval officer
Eric Clay (1922–2007), British rugby league referee
Ethel Clay (1874–1943), American nurse and socialite
Frederic Clay (1838–1889), British composer
 Frederick William Clay (1927–1983), known as Freddie, Indigenous Australian activist on Palm Island, Queensland (husband of Iris)
Grady Clay (1916–2013), American journalist
Henry Clay (1777–1852), American statesman and orator
 Iris Clay (1936–1979), Indigenous Australian activist on Palm Island, Queensland (wife of Fred)
James Clay (disambiguation), several people
John Clay (disambiguation), several people
Kaelin Clay (born 1992), American football player
Lacy Clay (born 1956), U.S. House Representative
Lauren Clay (born 1982), American artist 
Lucius D. Clay (1897–1978), American general and military governor
Otis Clay (1942–2016), American R&B and soul singer
Philippe Clay (1927–2007), French singer
Rudy Clay (politician) (1936–2013), American politician
Rudolph Valentino Clay (born 1944), birth name of American boxer Rahman Ali, brother of Cassius Clay (Muhammad Ali)
Sam Clay (born 1993), American baseball player

Given name
Clay Aiken (born 1978), American popular music singer
Clay Buchholz (born 1984), Major League Baseball pitcher for the Boston Red Sox
Clay Cook (born 1978), American guitarist, keyboardist, mandolinist, steel guitarist, and vocalist in Zac Brown Band
Clay Martin Croker (1962–2016), American voice actor and animator
Clay Dreslough, American video game designer
Clay Guida (born 1981), American mixed martial artist
Clay Hensley (born 1979), American baseball player
Clay Higgins (born 1961), American politician
Clay Jenkins (born 1964), American politician and lawyer
Clay S. Jenkinson (born 1955), American Rhodes Scholar and popular historical re-enactor
Clay Johnston (academic), American neurologist and university administrator
Clay Johnston (American football) (born 1996), American football player
Clay Kaytis (born 1973), American animator and director
Clay Matthews Sr. (1928–2017), American football player
Clay Matthews Jr. (born 1956), American football player, son of the above
Clay Matthews III (born 1986), American football player, son of the above
Clay Regazzoni (1939–2006), Swiss racing car driver
Clay V. Spear (c. 1914–1974), associate justice of the Idaho Supreme Court
Clay Sweeting, Bahamian politician
Clay Travis (born 1979), American sports journalist
Clay Walker (born 1969), American country music singer
Clay (born 1999), pseudonym Dream, American YouTuber and Minecraft gamer

Fictional characters
Clay, the first host of Playhouse Disney
Clay (Pokémon), in the Pokémon universe
Clay Bailey, in the American animated television series Xiaolin Showdown
Faceas Clay, an antagonist from the Strider Hiryu manga and NES game
Clay Davis, in American TV series The Wire
Clay Jensen, in the novel and Netflix series 13 Reasons Why
Clay Kaczmarek, from the Assassin's Creed games
Clay Moorington, from the Danish-Canadian animated television series Nexo Knights
Clay Morrow, from American TV series Sons of Anarchy
Clay Simons, in the game Grand Theft Auto: The Lost and Damned
Clay Terran, from the game series Ace Attorney: Dual Destinies
Caduceus Clay, from the American web series Critical Role
Clay Calloway, from Sing 2

See also
Claye

References

English-language surnames
Surnames of English origin
English masculine given names